Expectations is the debut studio album by American singer Bebe Rexha. It was released on June 22, 2018, by Warner Bros. Records. The album was announced following the success of her collaboration with country duo Florida Georgia Line, "Meant to Be". Expectations went out for pre-order on April 13, 2018, with the release of two promotional singles: "Ferrari" and "2 Souls on Fire". The album includes the singles "I Got You" and "Meant to Be" from All Your Fault: Pt. 1 and All Your Fault: Pt. 2, respectively. It features appearances from rappers Quavo and Tory Lanez, and country duo Florida Georgia Line.

Expectations received generally positive reviews from music critics, who praised its production and Rexha's vocal performance, while others criticized its lyricism. The album debuted at number thirteen on the US Billboard 200 chart, earning 24,000 album-equivalent units (including 10,000 copies as pure album sales) in its first week. As of January 2019, the album has sold 604,000 units (with 37,000 copies in pure album sales) in the US. On October 23, 2020 the album was certified platinum by the Recording Industry Association of America (RIAA) for combined sales and album-equivalent units of over a million units in the United States.

Background
Following the release of All Your Fault: Pt. 2 (2017), Rexha began teasing new songs for a third installment in the All Your Fault series, with her manager going on record about its release. However, it appeared plans had changed, as Rexha revealed her next project would be called Expectations through a tweet in November 2017. Rexha revealed the cover art on April 8, 2018, with the album being available for pre-order on April 13.

Singles
"I'm a Mess" was released as the lead single from the album on June 15, following an early radio release in the United States. It has so far peaked at number 35 on the Billboard Hot 100, becoming Rexha's first top 40 hit as a solo lead artist. "I Got You" and "Meant to Be" featuring Florida Georgia Line, from the first and second parts of All Your Fault respectively, were also included on the album.

Promotional singles
"Ferrari" and "2 Souls on Fire", the latter of which features Quavo of Migos, were released as promotional singles on April 13, 2018 with the pre-order of the album. "Ferrari" has since received a vertical video.

Critical reception

Expectations received mostly positive reviews. According to Metacritic, which assigns a weighted mean rating out of 100 to reviews from mainstream critics, the album received an average score of 65, based on six reviews, indicating “generally favorable reviews”. AllMusic's Neil Z. Yeung viewed the album as "an improvement upon her trio of EP releases that succeeds in presenting mature, forward-thinking pop of the dark, introspective variety" and concluded, "While it could benefit from some tightening – the middle stretch stalls the momentum – Expectations affirms Rexha's songwriting prowess, ear for catchy hooks, and ability to pull emotion from otherwise serviceable radio pop". Craig Jenkins from Vulture referred to the album as "a showcase for the versatility of her instrument, which is both high and hearty and also a little wan, capable of hitting incredible marks in its upper register at the cost of coming in a little shrill". He especially praised album's intriguing ideas, playful lyrics and memorable hooks, dubbing it "one of the week's easiest pleasures".

Ilana Kaplan and Nick Hasted from The Independent highlighted album's ballads "Grace" and "Knees", describing Expectations as "album full of flawed, self-deprecating and boundary-pushing pop offerings". Idolator's Mike Nied stated that the album "perfectly captures the superstar's ethos" and that Rexha's "very recognizable voice is absolutely riveting." Nevertheless, he opined that the inclusion of "Meant to Be" "feels out of place", despite being "her biggest hit to date". Nick Levine from NME perceived Rexha more as an "emo singer", while Refinery29s Courtney E. Smith described Rexha as an "anti-hero" and a "dangerous woman fiercely playing with themes of depression, a lack of self-control, and unpredictability". In addition, Smith expressed that the singer "did a masterful job of painting a nihilistic scene in which she's an observer, and sometimes an unreliable narrator", but emphasized a lack of "autobiographical impression". Rolling Stones Sarah Grant wrote that on Expectations, Rexha "paints herself as a heroine trapped in an ivory tower of her own making, but her cat-scratching upper register suggests sensitivity more than vengeance", calling it "an impressive debut album full of nostalgic heartache". Tommy Monroe from The Quietus stated that "a few tracks do do lack energy", however he described Rexha as "no ordinary singer" and "a chameleon who can switch vocals, blend with any sound, and find rhythm with any tempo".

In a less positive review, Laura Snapes of The Guardian criticized the overuse of Auto-Tune and Rexha's "desperate search of an identity" throughout the album, citing "Ferrari" as the "only remotely distinctive song".

Commercial performance
Expectations debuted at number 13 on the US Billboard 200 chart, earning 24,000 album-equivalent units (including 10,000 copies as pure album sales) in its first week. In Canada, the album debuted at number fourteen on the Billboard Canadian Albums . As of January 2019, the album has sold 604,000 units (with 37,000 copies in pure album sales) in the US. On October 23, 2020 the album was certified platinum by the Recording Industry Association of America (RIAA) for combined sales and album-equivalent units of over a million units in the United States.

Track listing

Sample credit
"I'm a Mess" contains an interpolation of the 1997 song "Bitch", performed by Meredith Brooks.

Notes
  signifies an additional vocal producer.
  signifies an additional producer.

Personnel
Production
 Management – Adam Mersel
 A&R – Jeff Levin
 Mitch McCarthy  – mixing (tracks 1–5, and 7–13)
 Manny Marroquin – mixing (track 6)
 Michelle Mancini – mastering
 Ron Blake - trumpet (track 7)

Charts

Weekly charts

Year-end charts

Certifications

References

2018 debut albums
Albums produced by Hit-Boy
Albums produced by Jason Evigan
Albums produced by Joey Moi
Albums produced by Louis Bell
Bebe Rexha albums
Warner Records albums